Guyana has competed in seventeen of the twenty previous Commonwealth Games. British Guiana was one of the eleven countries to compete in the first Games in 1930, and participated under that name until 1962. The country gained independence in 1966 as Guyana, and subsequently competed under that name.

Overall medal tally
At the 1930 British Empire Games, British Guiana won two medals. A silver medal was won by Colin Gordon in the high jump and a bronze medal was won in the coxed four event in rowing.
In the 1934 British Empire Games, a gold medal was won by Phil Edwards in the 880 yards. Edwards competed for Canada at several Olympic Games.

See also
All-time medal tally of Commonwealth Games

References

 
Nations at the Commonwealth Games